Alabama State University began sending draftees into the NFL in 1959. Since then, they have had 21 players drafted.

Key

Selections

References

Alabama State

Alabama State Hornets NFL draft